Jiang Fengyi (born 1963) is a Chinese scientist and educator in the fields of semiconductor. He is the current vice-president of Nanchang University. He has been hailed as "Father of silicon based luminescence in China". He is the director of the National Silicon-based LED Engineering Technology Research Center.

Education
Jiang was born into a family of farming background in Yugan County, Jiangxi in 1963. After the resumption of college entrance examination, he entered Jilin University, majoring in nuclear physics, where he graduated in 1984. He was a postgraduate at the Changchun Institute of Physics (now Institute of Optics and Physics), Chinese Academy of Sciences (CAS) between September 1987 and December 1989.

Career
After university, he joined the faculty of Jiangxi University of Technology as an assistant. He taught at Nanchang University since 1992, what he was promoted to associate professor in May 1992 and to full professor in May 1995. He is the vice-president of Nanchang University.

He was a delegate to the 19th National Congress of the Communist Party of China.

Honours and awards
 2016 State Technological Invention Award (First Class)
 November 22, 2019 Member of the Chinese Academy of Sciences (CAS)
 November 26, 2019 Laureate of AOA

References

1962 births
Living people
People from Yugan County
Scientists from Jiangxi
Educators from Jiangxi
Members of the Chinese Academy of Sciences